Swami Vivekananda University or Sri Vivekanand Niji University (SVN) is a private university located in Sagar, Madhya Pradesh, India. The university was established in 2011 and it is approved by the University Grants Commission.

History 
The university was established by the Act of Madhya Pradesh State Legislature and notified in its Official Gazette as The Madhya Pradesh Niji Vishwavidyalaya (Staphana Avam Sanchalan) Tritiya Sansodhan Adhiniyam (Act No.44 of 2011- 31 December 2011).

Courses 
The university offers both under-graduate and postgraduate courses in various fields such as engineering, law, education, pharmacy, commerce, arts and science.

References

External links 
 

Educational institutions established in 2012
Private universities in India
Education in Sagar, Madhya Pradesh
2012 establishments in Madhya Pradesh